Lamech (Lémeḵ, in pausa  Lā́meḵ) is a person in Cain's genealogy in the fourth chapter of the Book of Genesis. His father was named Methushael. This Lamech is distinguished from the other Lamech mentioned subsequently in Genesis, who was a descendant of Adam's third son Seth.

Biblical context
Sandwiched between two genealogical lines, the passage describing Lamech, son of Methushael, descendant of Cain and his children is fairly substantive:

19 And Lamech took unto him two wives: the name of the one [was] Adah, and the name of the other Zillah.
20 And Adah bare Jabal: he was the father of such as dwell in tents, and [of such as have] cattle.
21 And his brother's name [was] Jubal: he was the father of all such as handle the harp and organ.
22 And Zillah, she also bare Tubalcain, an instructor of every artificer in brass and iron: and the sister of Tubalcain [was] Naamah.
23 And Lamech said unto his wives, Adah and Zillah, Hear my voice; ye wives of Lamech, hearken unto my speech: for I have slain a man to my wounding, and a young man to my hurt.
24 If Cain shall be avenged sevenfold, truly Lamech seventy and sevenfold.—

Names
There are various suggestions for the correct translations for the names:

Interpretation
When fully translated, the text resembles mythology concerning the origin of the various forms of civilization, the shepherds and musicians being products of the day, and pleasure being a product of the night. Blacksmiths, in carrying out their trade, are also associated with the darkness. Lamech could be interpreted as a culture hero. Some  speculate that the names demonstrate punning: Jabal, Jubal, and Tubal rhyme, and possibly derive from the same root: JBL (YVL in modern Hebrew): to bring forth, (also) to carry. A similar description existed amongst Phoenicians.

The names are instead interpreted in the Midrash as an attack on polygamy. Adah is there interpreted as the deposed one, implying that Lamech spurned her in favour of Zillah, whose own name is understood to mean she shaded herself [from Zillah at Lamech's side]. The Midrash consequently regards Adah as having been treated as a slave, tyrannised by her husband, who was at the beck and call of his mistress, Zillah. It goes on to claim that part of the immorality, which had led God to flood the Earth, was the polygamy practised by Lamech and his generation.

The rabbinical tradition is just as condemning of Naamah. While a minority, such as Abba bar Kahana, see Naamah as having become Noah's wife, and being so named because her conduct was pleasing to God, the majority of classical rabbinical sources consider her name to be due to her singing pleasant songs in worship of idols.

The pedigree assigned to Lamech in the Genesis genealogies bears similarities to that given for Lamech, father of Noah, and it has been suggested that they represent different versions of the same original pedigree.

Song of the Sword
The last part of the account of Lamech, takes the form of a brief poem, which refers back to the curse of Cain. In the poem, Lamech's stance resembles that of a supreme warrior, able to avenge himself absolutely. However, no explanation of who Lamech supposedly killed is ever given in the Tanakh. Some scholars have proposed that it is connected to the invention, contextually by Tubal-Cain, of the sword, for which reason the poem is often referred to as the Song of the Sword. The poem may originate from the mysterious Book of the Wars of the Lord, though the greater context for it is likely to remain obscure.

However, this paucity of context did not stop a rabbinical tradition growing up around it. The Talmud and Midrash present an extensive legend, told, for example, by Rashi, in which Lamech first loses his sight from age, and had to be led by Tubal-Cain, the seventh generation from Cain. Tubal-Cain saw in the distance something that he first took for an animal, but it was actually Cain (still alive, due to the extensive life span of the antediluvians) whom Lamech had accidentally killed with an arrow. When they discovered who it was, Lamech, in sorrow, clapped his hands together, accidentally striking and killing Tubal-Cain. In consequence, Lamech's wives desert him. A similar legend is preserved in the pseudepigraphic Second Book of Adam and Eve, Chapter XIII; in this version Tubal-Cain is not named, but is instead referred to as "the young shepherd." After Lamech claps his hands he strikes the young shepherd on the head. To ensure his death, he then smashed his head with a rock.

An alternate form of this negative attitude towards Lamech (such as Targum Pseudo-Jonathan) claims that even though Lamech did not kill anyone, his wives refused to associate with him and denied him sex, on the grounds that Cain's line was to be annihilated after seven generations. The poem is then given by Lamech to allay their fears. Other classical sources, such as Josephus, see the word seventy-seven as the number of sons which Lamech eventually had.

Extending on this classical view of Lamech is the Book of Moses, regarded in Mormonism as scripture. According to this Latter-day Saint text, Lamech entered into a secret pact with Satan, as had Cain before him, becoming a second Master Mahan. When Irad (an ancestor of Lamech) learned his secret and began to publicise it, Lamech murdered him. News of the murder was spread by Lamech's two wives, leading to his being cast out of society.

Family tree

See also
 Genealogies of Genesis

References

Book of Genesis people
Biblical murderers
Bereshit (parashah)